Ayodeji Joshua Oluwapelumi Akinola Elerewe (born 14 September 2003) is an English professional footballer who plays as a centre-back for Bromley on loan from League One club Charlton Athletic.

Career

Charlton Athletic
Elerewe joined the youth academy of Charlton Athletic at the age of 13, and worked his way up their youth categories. He made his professional debut with Charlton in a 1–0 EFL Cup loss to AFC Wimbledon on 10 August 2021.

Wealdstone (loan)
On 30 July 2022, Elerewe joined National League side Wealdstone on loan until 2 January 2023. He made his Wealdstone debut on 6 August 2022, in a 3–2 win over Bromley.

On 7 November 2022, it was confirmed that Charlton had recalled Elerewe due to injuries at the club.

Bromley (loan)
On 3 March 2023, Elerewe joined National League side Bromley on loan until the end of the 2022–23 season.

Personal life
Born in England, Elerewe is of Nigerian descent.

Career statistics

References

External links
 
 

2003 births
Living people
English footballers
English people of Nigerian descent
Charlton Athletic F.C. players
Wealdstone F.C. players
Bromley F.C. players
English Football League players
National League (English football) players
Association football defenders
Black British sportspeople